Marshal Forwards is a 1932 German historical war film directed by Heinz Paul and starring Paul Wegener, Traute Carlsen and Hans Graf von Schwerin.

It portrays the life of Gebhard Leberecht von Blücher, a German hero of the Napoleonic Wars who was present at the Battle of Leipzig and the Battle of Waterloo. It takes its name from Blücher's contemporary nickname, which came from his aggressive forward-thinking stance. It is part of the Prussian film genre, popular during the Weimair and Nazi eras.

Plot 
Prussia at the time of the Napoleonic attack in the early 19th century. The country can hardly defend itself against the attacks of the French. The battle of Jena and Auerstedt was lost in 1806, Berlin was occupied, King Friedrich Wilhelm III. and Queen Luise have fled to Memel, far in the northeast of the country. Near Ratekau, near Lübeck, the popular old marshal Blücher, a veritable warhorse, had to capitulate to the overwhelming enemy because he ran out of food and ammunition. Since Prussia's alliance with Russia still exists, however, all does not seem lost. Blücher is exchanged for a French general. Immediately, he goes to his king in Memel to ask the monarch to join forces for an attack against the French aggressors. Here, however, Blücher learns that Russia has its own interests and is unwilling to take action against Napoleon alongside the Prussians. Now Blücher is also resigned. After the humiliating French peace dictate of Tilsit in 1807, in which Prussia largely relinquished its independence to the French, the almost 70-year-old General Blücher retired to his country estate, deeply disappointed.

In several fire letters to his king, the aged marshal urges Friedrich Wilhelm not to accept the fate imposed on his country by Napoleon. The choleric Corsican emperor gets wind of it and forces the Prussian king to finally send Blücher into retirement. When Napoleon's fortunes in war seemed to turn around in the endless expanses of Russia and the French were only on the march back, new courage to live awakened in the aged Blücher. The decisive factor for him is the Prussian-Russian agreement, which is reflected in the Tauroggen Convention at the end of 1812 and de facto means that the Prussian aid organizations are breaking out of cooperation with French troops. Blücher, now appointed by the king to head the Prussian army, rallies his followers around him and a new strategy for defeating Napoleon is discussed. On the side of the Russians one experiences defeats and minor victories; Only when the Austrians joined the alliance did Napoleon's army suffer a painful defeat for the first time at the Battle of the Nations near Leipzig. Blücher's forward drive, his unconditional drive on his people, earned him the nickname "Marshal Forwards".

Production 
Marschall Forward was created on 22 July 1932 in the Johannisthal Studios in Berlin. The film had ten acts and was 2780 meters long. On 24 October 1932, the censorship released him for young people. The premiere took place on 23 November 1932 in Berlin's Titania Palace and in the atrium.

Producer August Mueller was also production manager, Harry Dettmann production manager. The film constructions come from the hands of Robert A. Dietrich (design) and Bruno Lutz (execution). Composer Willy Schmidt-Gentner also had the musical direction. Hermann Birkhofer provided the sound. Georg von Viebahn served as a military advisor.

Cast

References

Bibliography

External links 
 

1932 films
Films of the Weimar Republic
German historical films
1930s historical films
German war films
1932 war films
1930s German-language films
Films directed by Heinz Paul
Films set in 1806
Films set in 1807
Films set in 1812
Films set in Leipzig
Napoleonic Wars films
Prussian films
German black-and-white films
Depictions of Napoleon on film
Cultural depictions of Gebhard Leberecht von Blücher
Cultural depictions of Klemens von Metternich
Films set in the Kingdom of Prussia
1930s German films
Films shot at Johannisthal Studios